The Pakistan cricket team toured England in the 1987 season to play a five-match Test series against England. Pakistan won the series 1-0 with 4 matches drawn. This was the first Test series that Pakistan won against England in England.

One Day Internationals (ODIs)

England won the Texaco Trophy 2-1.

1st ODI

2nd ODI

3rd ODI

Test series summary

First Test

Second Test

Third Test

Fourth Test

Fifth Test

The Pakistan innings of 708 is the highest in Test match history not to feature a wide.

Annual reviews
 Playfair Cricket Annual 1988
 Wisden Cricketers' Almanack 1988

References

External sources
 Pakistan tour of England 1987 at ESPN Cricinfo
 CricketArchive – tour itineraries

1987 in Pakistani sport
1987 in English cricket
1987
International cricket competitions from 1985–86 to 1988